Karl Seip (5 April 1850 – 16 September 1909) was a Norwegian priest and educator, who also served as the Minister of Education and Church Affairs from 1908 to 1909.

Personal life
Karl Seip was born in Christiania as the son of priest Hans Christian Caspar Seip (1812-1872) and grandson of military officer and politician Andreas Martin Seip (1790–1850).

Through his brother, priest Jens Laurits Arup Seip, Karl was the uncle of Hans Kristian Seip and Didrik Arup Seip, and a granduncle of Hans Kristian and Jens Arup Seip. Through another brother, priest Martin Fredrik Seip, Karl was a granduncle of Helge and Martin Fredrik Seip.

Career
Karl Seip graduated with the cand.theol. degree in 1873, and was hired as a teacher at the Botsfengselet prison the next year. He was then appointed vicar in Åfjord in 1883 and in Fosen in 1890. From 1898 to 1908 he worked as school director in the Diocese of Trondhjem.

In 1908, when the Liberal first cabinet Knudsen assumed office, Seip was appointed as Minister of Education and Church Affairs. He was granted a leave of absence on 8 July 1909, his place taken by acting Minister Knut Johannes Hougen. Seip died only two months later.

References

1850 births
1909 deaths
Norwegian priest-politicians
Norwegian educators
Government ministers of Norway
Liberal Party (Norway) politicians
Karl
Ministers of Education of Norway